Anne-Marie Minvielle (16 September 1943 – 3 January 2019) was a French journalist.

Biography
Minvielle started her career as a tour guide in the Pyrenees Mountains and numerous French national parks. After working for the Ministry of Culture as a photographer, she became a journalist in 1980.

Minvielle wrote tourism reports for France, Spain, Ireland, Italy, Norway, Sweden, Great Britain, Croatia, Austria, Cyprus, Finland, and Russia. She became editor-in-chief of Randonnée Magazine in 1982, and was a freelancer for Pyrénées-Magazine, Alpes-Magazine, Alpinisme et Randonnée, L’Ami des Jardins, Le Monde, GEO, Marche-Magazine, and Détours en France. She was also a correspondent of the Fédération Française de la Randonnée Pédestre (French Federation of Hiking). In this position, she wrote many hiking guides for the Green belt, Hauts-de-Seine, Yvelines, Yonne, Seine-et-Marne, Basque Country, Béarn, Seine-Saint-Denis, Essonne, Val-de-Marne, and Val-d’Oise.

She was a member of the World Federation of Travel Journalists and Writers (FIJET), the Association des Journalistes du Jardin et de l'Horticulture (AJJH), and the Union des photographes créateurs (UPC).

Awards
Malta Tourism Press Award (2011)
Prize of the French Association of Journalists and Tourism Writers (2011)

References

1943 births
2019 deaths
French journalists